Ronald David McLelland (27 March 1926 – 1 February 2014) was a Progressive Conservative party member of the House of Commons of Canada. He was a farmer by career.

He was elected to Parliament at the Rosetown—Biggar riding in the 1965 general election. After completing only one term in office, the 27th Parliament, McLelland left the House of Commons and did not seek re-election in the 1968 election. He died at a Saskatoon hospital on 1 February 2014.

References

External links
 

1926 births
2014 deaths
Members of the House of Commons of Canada from Saskatchewan
Progressive Conservative Party of Canada MPs